Connor Sparrow (born May 10, 1994) is an American soccer player who currently plays for Tampa Bay Rowdies in the USL Championship.

Career

College and Amateur
Sparrow began his college soccer career at the University of Missouri–Kansas City in 2012, before transferring to Creighton University.

While at college, Sparrow played with Premier Development League side IMG Academy Bradenton in 2014 and 2015.

Professional
On January 19, 2016, Sparrow was selected in the fourth round (65th overall) of the 2016 MLS SuperDraft by Real Salt Lake. He signed with Salt Lake's United Soccer League affiliate Real Monarchs on March 18, 2016.

On September 11, 2017, Sparrow moved to the Monarchs' parent club Real Salt Lake.

On December 13, 2018, Sparrow signed with USL club Nashville SC.

Sparrow moved back to MLS on January 20, 2020, joining Chicago Fire. He was released by Chicago at the end of the 2020 season.

On January 21, 2021, Sparrow signed with USL Championship club Miami FC.

On December 23, 2022, it was announced that Sparrow would be a Tampa Bay Rowdies player for their 2023 season.

References

External links

 

1994 births
Living people
American soccer players
Association football goalkeepers
Creighton Bluejays men's soccer players
IMG Academy Bradenton players
Real Monarchs players
Real Salt Lake draft picks
Real Salt Lake players
Nashville SC (2018–19) players
Chicago Fire FC players
Miami FC players
Tampa Bay Rowdies players
Soccer players from St. Louis
Kansas City Roos men's soccer players
USL Championship players
USL League Two players